A Pinch of Snuff is a British television crime drama miniseries, consisting of three fifty-minute episodes, that broadcast on ITV network from 9 to 23 April 1994. The series, adapted from the 1978 novel of the same name by author Reginald Hill, was the first Dalziel and Pascoe adaptation for TV, arriving two years before the more widely known BBC adaptation that followed in 1996. In this miniseries, the characters of Dalziel and Pascoe were played by comedians Gareth Hale and Norman Pace, with Christopher Fairbank as loyal sidekick Edgar Wield, and Malcolm Storry as Insp. Ray Crabtree.

Reception
The series broadcast over three consecutive Saturday nights, from 9 April 1994. Reginald Hill was said to have been unhappy with the series, and so prevented ITV from creating any further adaptations for television. The Independent went on to describe the "critical contempt heaped on the first television version" of the legendary characters. It described how "a complex story of pornography and murder was turned into a vehicle for the dramatic talents of Hale and Pace, by common consent breathtakingly miscast as the chalk-and-cheese Yorkshire coppers. While either of them might conceivably have scraped by as the blunt, earthy Dalziel, it's hard to see how anybody could have imagined one of them playing the sensitive, intellectual Pascoe".

BBC Worldwide subsequently approached Hill with a view to creating a new TV adaptation, to which Hill agreed. Actors Warren Clarke and Colin Buchanan were subsequently cast in the roles of Dalziel and Pascoe, and between 16 March 1996 and 22 June 2007, eleven series consisting of both novel adaptations and original stories were produced.

Cast
 Gareth Hale as Insp. Andy Dalziel
 Norman Pace as Sgt. Peter Pascoe
 Christopher Fairbank as Det. Sgt. Edgar Wield
 Freddie Jones as Dr. Gilbert Haggard
 John McGlynn as Jack Shorter
 Malcolm Storry as Insp. Ray Crabtree
 Ursula Howells as Alice Andover
 Elizabeth Spriggs as Annabelle Andover
 John Woodvine as Godfrey Blengdale
 Linda Marlowe as Gwen Blengdale
 Paul Copley as Charlie Heppelwhite
 John Simm as Clint Heppelwhite

Episodes

References

External links
 

1990s British television miniseries
1994 British television series debuts
1994 British television series endings
1990s British crime television series
1990s British drama television series
ITV television dramas
English-language television shows
Television series by ITV Studios
Television series by Yorkshire Television
Television shows set in Yorkshire